The Mettur Thermal Power Station is a coal-fired electric power station located in [Thoppur-Mettur Dam-Bhavani-Erode Rd, Mettur, Tamil Nadu 636406] Salem district of Tamil Nadu. It is operated by Tamil Nadu Generation and Distribution Corporation Limited. The power station was commissioned during various periods from 1987 and this is the first inland thermal Power Station of TANGEDCO.The coal from Mahanadi Coalfields Limited (Talcher and Ib Valley) and Eastern Coalfields Limited (Raniganj and Mugma) are transported to the load ports of Paradip (Orissa), Vizag (Andhra Pradesh) and Haldia (West Bengal).  Thereafter the coal is transported to the discharge ports of Ennore and Tuticorin by ships.  From Ennore Port the coal is transported again through rail to Ennore Thermal Power Station and Mettur Thermal Power Station.

BGR Energy Systems Ltd was the EPC contractor for 600 MW unit 5 of the power plant.

Plants

References

Coal-fired power stations in Tamil Nadu
Salem district
Energy infrastructure completed in 1987
1987 establishments in Tamil Nadu